The Nüschenstock is a mountain of the Glarus Alps, located south of Linthal in canton of Glarus. On its eastern side it overlooks the Muttsee.

References

External links
Nüschenstock on Hikr

Mountains of the Alps
Mountains of Switzerland
Mountains of the canton of Glarus
Two-thousanders of Switzerland